Nikola Prsendic (born February 7, 1979, in Pozarevac, Serbia) is a contemporary artist and painter, currently based in Belgrade, Serbia.

Biography
Prsendic graduated in 2005 from the Academy of Fine Art in Novi Sad, Serbia. In 2008, he relocated to Rome, Italy, for a painting specialistica (equivalent to a master's degree program) at the city's renowned Accademia di Belle Arti.

In addition to his career as an independent painter, Prsendic has worked with Italian sculptor and film director Giovanni Albanese, providing creative consultation and curatorial assistance.

Recent exhibitions
Prsendic's paintings have been exhibited in cities across Italy and Serbia, including, but not limited to, the following (listed in reverse chronological order):
2020 : Zapis Kujava, online exhibition, kulturni centar "Laza Kostić" Sombor, Serbia [] 
2020 : Zapis Kujava, ULUCG Podgorica, Montenegro [] 
2019: Roma made in Serbia (Istituto Italiano di Cultura) Belgrado, Serbia
2019: Art without borders (Nacionalna galerija) Belgrade, Serbia
2018: "forest made in forest" (gallery Affiche), Milano, Italy
2018 Exhibition of new members of ULUS in Paviljon (Cvijeta Zuzorić) Belgrade, Serbi 
2016: "BANG": Nacionalna Galerija (National Gallery), Belgrade, Serbia (solo)
2015: Nikola Prsendic, House of King Peter I Karadjordjevic, Belgrade, Serbia (solo)
2014: "MACADAM": Galleria l'Affiche, Milan, Italy (solo)
2012: A piedi scalzi, Rome, Italy (collective)
2011: Primaverile Romana, Associazione Romana Gallerie d’Arte Moderna, Museo Crocetti, Rome, Italy (collective)
2010: Nikola Prsendic, Librogalleria Al Ferro di Cavallo, Rome, Italy (solo)
2010: Premio Nazionale delle Arti, Accademia di Belle Arti, Naples, Italy (collective)
2010: Primo Premio (First prize) al Concorso Biennale Arte e Sport 2009/2010, Auditorium Parco della Musica, Rome, Italy
2008: Nikola Prsendic, Galeria Dom Omladine, Kragujevac, Serbia (solo)
2007: Third Summer Exhibition, Galerija Narodne Biblioteke “Vuk Karadzic”, Veliko Gradiste, Serbia (solo)
2006: Second Summer Exhibition, Galerija Narodne Biblioteke “Vuk Karadzic”, Veliko Gradiste, Serbia (solo)
2005: Izlozba crteza studenata cetvrte godine akademije umetnosti Novi Sad, galeria ART KLINIK, Novi Sad, Serbia (collective)

External links
Portfolio of Nikola Prsendic

References

21st-century Serbian painters
21st-century Serbian male artists
Serbian male painters
1979 births
Living people